Phillip Island is an island in the Australian state of Victoria.

Phillip Island may also refer to:

 Phillip Island (Norfolk Island), an island south of Norfolk Island
 Stephens Island (British Columbia), formerly known as Philip Island

Other uses
 Phillip Island Grand Prix Circuit
 Phillip Island Important Bird Area
 Phillip Island Nature Park